The following is the 1997–98 network television schedule for the six major English language commercial broadcast networks in the United States. The schedule covers primetime hours from September 1997 through August 1998. The schedule is followed by a list per network of returning series, new series, and series cancelled after the 1996–97 season. All times are Eastern and Pacific, with certain exceptions, such as Monday Night Football.

New series highlighted in bold.

Each of the 30 highest-rated shows is listed with its rank and rating as determined by Nielsen Media Research. and 

 Yellow indicates the programs in the top 10 for the season.
 Cyan indicates the programs in the top 20 for the season.
 Magenta indicates the programs in the top 30 for the season.
Other Legend
 Light blue indicates local programming.
 Gray indicates encore programming.
 Blue-gray indicates news programming.
 Light green indicates sporting events.
 Light Purple indicates movies. 
 Red indicates series being burned off and other regularly scheduled programs, including specials.

PBS is not included; member stations have local flexibility over most of their schedules and broadcast times for network shows may vary.

From February 7 to 22, 1998, all of CBS' primetime programming was preempted in favor of coverage of the 1998 Winter Olympics in Nagano.

For new series debuting during the season, it would ultimately prove to be one of the weakest seasons in American television history, as only ten shows would be picked up for a second season. Of those ten shows, only five (Dharma & Greg, Two Guys and a Girl, Ally McBeal, For Your Love and Dawson's Creek) would last beyond three seasons, and would all end their runs within six seasons.

For its tenth and final season, onetime CBS powerhouse Murphy Brown was moved from its lifelong home of Monday nights to Wednesday, where it lost a significant number of viewers. For its last block of episodes in the spring, the show was put back into the familiar timeslot that it had once used to anchor the CBS Monday night lineup.

Sunday

Monday

Tuesday

Wednesday

Thursday 

NOTE: On Fox, Rewind was supposed to air 8-8:30, but it was cancelled due to production troubles.

Friday

Saturday

By network

ABC

Returning series
20/20
The ABC Sunday Night Movie
America's Funniest Home Videos
Boy Meets World
The Drew Carey Show
Ellen
Grace Under Fire
Home Improvement
Monday Night Football
NYPD Blue
The Practice
Primetime Live
Sabrina the Teenage Witch
Something So Right (moved from NBC)
Soul Man
Spin City

New series
ABC News Saturday Night
C-16: FBI
Cracker
Dharma & Greg
Hiller and Diller
Maximum Bob *
Nothing Sacred
Over the Top
Prey *
Push *
Teen Angel
That's Life *
Timecop
Total Security
Two Guys, a Girl and a Pizza Place *
The Wonderful World of Disney
You Wish

Not returning from 1996–97:
Arsenio
Clueless (moved to UPN)
Coach
Common Law
Dangerous Minds
Family Matters (moved to CBS)
Gun
Hangin' with Mr. Cooper
High Incident
Leaving L.A.
Life's Work
Lois & Clark: The New Adventures of Superman
Murder One
Relativity
Roseanne (revived and returned for 2017–18 for one season)
Second Noah
Spy Game
Step by Step (moved to CBS)
Townies
Turning Point
Vital Signs

CBS

Returning series
48 Hours
60 Minutes
Candid Camera
CBS Sunday Movie
Chicago Hope
Cosby
Cybill
Diagnosis Murder
Dr. Quinn, Medicine Woman
Early Edition
Everybody Loves Raymond
Family Matters (moved from ABC)
JAG
Murphy Brown
The Nanny
Nash Bridges
Promised Land
Step by Step (moved from ABC)
Touched by an Angel
Unsolved Mysteries (moved from NBC)
Walker, Texas Ranger

New series
Brooklyn South
The Closer *
Dellaventura
Four Corners *
George and Leo
The Gregory Hines Show
Kids Say the Darndest Things *
The Magnificent Seven *
Meego
Michael Hayes
Public Eye with Bryant Gumbel
The Simple Life *
Style & Substance *

Not returning from 1996–97:
Almost Perfect
Dave's World
EZ Streets
Ink
Life... and Stuff
Mr. & Mrs. Smith
Moloney
Orleans
Pearl
Public Morals
Temporarily Yours
Feds

Fox

Returning series
America's Most Wanted
Beverly Hills, 90210
Beyond Belief: Fact or Fiction
COPS
FOX Night at the Movies
King of the Hill
Living Single
Melrose Place
Millennium
New York Undercover
Party of Five
The Simpsons
The X-Files

New series
413 Hope St.
Ally McBeal
Ask Harriet *
Between Brothers
Damon *
Fox Files *
Getting Personal *
Rewind
Significant Others *
The Visitor
The World's Funniest!
World's Wildest Police Videos *

Not returning from 1996–97:
Big Deal
Lawless
Love and Marriage
Lush Life
Married... with Children 
Martin
Ned and Stacey
Pacific Palisades
Party Girl
Pauly
Roar
Sliders

NBC

Returning series
3rd Rock from the Sun
Caroline in the City
Dateline NBC
ER
Fired Up
Frasier
Friends
Homicide: Life on the Street
Just Shoot Me!
Law & Order
Mad About You
Men Behaving Badly
The Naked Truth
NBC Sunday Night Movie
NewsRadio
The Pretender
Profiler
Seinfeld
Suddenly Susan

New series
Built to Last
For Your Love *
House Rules *
Jenny
LateLine *
Players
Sleepwalkers
Stressed Eric *
The Tony Danza Show
Union Square
Veronica's Closet
Working

Not returning from 1996–97:
Boston Common
Chicago Sons
Crisis Center
Dark Skies
The Jeff Foxworthy Show
The John Larroquette Show
Mr. Rhodes
Prince Street
The Single Guy
Something So Right (moved to ABC)
Unsolved Mysteries (moved to CBS)
Wings

UPN

Returning series
Clueless (moved from ABC)
In the House
Malcolm & Eddie
Moesha
The Sentinel
Sparks
Star Trek: Voyager

New series
Good News
Head Over Heels
Hitz
Love Boat: The Next Wave *

Not returning from 1996–97:
The Burning Zone
Goode Behavior
Homeboys in Outer Space
Social Studies

The WB

Returning series
7th Heaven
Buffy the Vampire Slayer
The Jamie Foxx Show
Nick Freno: Licensed Teacher
The Parent 'Hood
Sister, Sister
Smart Guy
The Steve Harvey Show
Unhappily Ever After
The Wayans Bros.

New series
Alright Already
Dawson's Creek *
Invasion America *
Kelly Kelly *
Three *
The Tom Show
You're the One *

Not returning from 1996–97:
Brotherly Love
Kirk
Life with Roger
Savannah

Note: The * indicates that the program was introduced in midseason.

References

United States primetime network television schedules
United States Network Television Schedule, 1997 98
United States Network Television Schedule, 1997 98